The Alive and the Dead is a 1964 Soviet film directed by Aleksandr Stolper based on the eponymous 1959 novel The Living and the Dead by Konstantin Simonov.

Plot 
The film takes place in a time warp from the first days of the Great Patriotic War and until the middle of the winter of 1941–1942, before the beginning of the Soviet counterattack near Moscow. Ivan Sintsov (Kirill Lavrov) is a correspondent with an army newspaper. The war starts while he is on vacation with his wife. He tries to return to his unit which is located in Western Belarus. However, it is impossible since the unit is overrun by the advancing Wehrmacht. Near the town of Borisov, he meets another officer also trying to reach his unit. They go on a road and try to get a car going in the direction they need. As the other officer stopped the car, a German air raid starts. The direct hit blows up the officer and the car he stops. Sintsov continues his journey alone. He is eventually assigned to one military newspaper, located in Mogilev and, later, another near Yelnia. The movie describes his work as a war correspondent during these trying times.

Cast
 Kirill Lavrov as Ivan Sintsov 
 Viktor Avdyushko as Sergeant Shestakov, commander of the gun
 Anatoli Papanov as General Serpilin
 Aleksei Glazyrin as Malinin
 Oleg Yefremov as Ivanov
 Lyudmila Krylova as Ovsyannikova
 Ludmila Lyubimova as Masha Sintsova
 Lev Lyubetskiy as Commissar
 Vasili Makarov	as Nikolay Petrovich Zaichikov
 Roman Khomyatov as Lyusun
 Yevgeny Samoylov	 as  Communist commander of a battalion
 Zinovy Vysokovsky  as Mikhail Weinstein, military photographer
 Oleg Tabakov as Krutikov
 Boris Chirkov as Biryukov
 Mikhail Gluzsky as Major General Orlov
 Yevgeni Shutov as policeman
 Valentina Telegina as aunt Pasha Kulikova
 Mikhail Ulyanov as Sergei Filippovich, Army Commander
 Lyubov Sokolova as doctor (episode)
 Vladimir Vysotsky as soldier (episode)
 Alla Budnitskaya as Masha's friend

References

External links

1964 films
Mosfilm films
Soviet black-and-white films
Vladimir Vysotsky
1964 in the Soviet Union
Films set in Belarus
Films set in Russia
Films based on military novels
Films based on Russian novels
1960s Russian-language films
Russian World War II films